Lagunitas or Lagunita may refer to:

 Lagunitas, California, an unincorporated community in Marin County
 Lagunitas-Forest Knolls, California, a census-designated place in Marin County
 Lagunitas Brewing Company, a brewery founded in Lagunitas, California
 Lagunitas Creek, in Marin County, California 
 Lake Lagunitas, a reservoir on Lagunitas Creek
 Lagunita, an ancient Mayan city
 Lake Lagunita, a dry artificial lake on the Stanford University campus in California
 Lagunitas Formation (disambiguation), several geological formations

See also
 Laguna (disambiguation)
 Lagunas (disambiguation)